Wyclef Jean Presents The Carnival, also known simply as The Carnival, is the debut studio album released by Haitian hip hop musician Wyclef Jean. The album was released on June 24, 1997, Wyclef Jean also served as the album's executive producer. The album features guest appearances from Celia Cruz, The Neville Brothers and multiple appearances from Jean's former Fugees bandmates, Lauryn Hill and Pras.

The album was released to critical acclaim. While commercially it peaked at number sixteen on the US Billboard 200 chart, and at number four on the US Top R&B/Hip-Hop Albums chart. It garnered Jean three Grammy Award nominations, Including two nominations at the 40th Annual Grammy Awards, for Best Rap Album and Best Rap Performance by a Duo or Group for "Guantanamera", and Best Rap Solo Performance at the 41st Grammy Awards in 1999, for his top ten hit "Gone till November".

Music and lyrics 
The album encompasses many musical genres, including hip hop, reggae, folk, disco, soul, Son Cubano and Haitian music. The album features guest appearances from Celia Cruz, The Neville Brothers, John Forté, Jeni Fujita, and Jean's bandmates from The Fugees, Lauryn Hill and Pras, among others. It also features skits between many of its songs, most of them set in a fictional trial for Wyclef Jean, in which he is accused of being "a player" and a "bad influence". The final three songs on the album are sung in Haitian Creole.

Critical reception 

The Carnival was released to critical acclaim. In a contemporary review for The Village Voice, music critic Robert Christgau found the album more R&B than the "diasporan flavors" it uses as "half decoration, half concept", and remarked that Jean uses the sampler for "one-dimensional tunes" that showcase his "well-articulated morality tales and popwise carnivalesque." In his review for Playboy, Christgau asserted that the album is more likely than any other well-meaning hip hop to impact the demographic it aims at and also works as an attempt to prove Jean is equally worthy of the attention given to Lauryn Hill.

Stephen Thompson of The A.V. Club, in a favorable review, called The Carnival "a stunning solo album that's light years beyond The Score". He also wrote "In his universalist embrace of music of all forms, Wyclef Jean makes a more powerful call for peace and unity than a thousand East Coast–West Coast 'Stop the violence, y'all' intros put together." The Carnival was voted the sixteenth best album of the year in The Village Voices annual Pazz & Jop critics poll for 1997. Christgau, the poll's creator, ranked it twentieth on his own list.

In 2011, Rolling Stone ranked The Carnival the 69th best album of the 1990s.

Commercial performance 
The Carnival debuted at number sixteen on the US Billboard 200, selling 52,000 copies in it first week. It also debuted at number four on the US Top R&B/Hip-Hop Albums chart. The album spawned the singles "Gone Till November", "We Trying to Stay Alive", "Guantanamera" and "To All the Girls". On December 16, 1998, the album was certified double platinum by the Recording Industry Association of America (RIAA), and sold approximately two million copies worldwide.

Track listing

Personnel
 Wyclef Jean – guitar, keyboards
 Rita Marley – background vocals
 Judy Mowatt – background vocals
 Marcia Griffiths – background vocals
 Sonny Kompanek – arranger
 Salaam Remi – producer, engineer, mixing
 Warren Riker – mastering, mixing
 Rudy – assistant engineer
 DJ Skribble – scratching
 Funkmaster Flex – scratching
 Crazy Sam & Da Verbal Assassins – performer
 Manuel Lecuona – mastering
 Rawle Gittens – mixing assistant
 Tony Gonzales – assistant engineer
 Lauryn Hill – arranger, performer, executive producer
 Jerry Duplessis – guitar, bass, producer
 Alex Olsson – mixing assistant
 John Forté – performer
 Jay Nicholas – mixing assistant
 Pras – performer, executive producer
 Melky Sedeck – performer
 New York Philharmonic Orchestra – performer
 Tomas Muscionico – photography
 Mike Roach – mixing assistant
 Storm Jefferson – mixing assistant
 Paul Epworth – assistant engineer
 Brian Dozoretz – engineer, mixing assistant
 Jocelyne Béroard – performer
 Sweet Micky – performer
 The Neville Brothers – performer
 Celia Cruz – performer

Charts

Weekly charts

Certifications

References

1997 debut albums
Albums produced by Wyclef Jean
Concept albums
Wyclef Jean albums
Albums produced by Jerry Duplessis